is a fairly well known comedy duo under the company Yoshimoto Kogyo. The group consists of the boke,  and the tsukkomi, both from Osaka Prefecture. Shirakawa is known as a skilled hand in the kitchen.

External links
Official website 

Japanese comedy duos
male actors from Osaka